Aughton is a village and civil parish in the Borough of West Lancashire of Lancashire, England, between Ormskirk and Maghull. It is a residential area with tree lined roads being found in all parts of the parish and an area of 1,658 hectares. The northern part is known as Aughton village, the south-west as Holt Green and the south-east as Town Green.

Demographics and politics 
At the 2001 Census, Aughton had a population of 8,342, reducing to 8,068 at the 2011 Census. The parish includes Aughton village itself, and part of the Aughton Park estate, which is a southern suburb of Ormskirk, along with Town Green in the south-east and Holt Green in the south-west.

Aughton has its own parish council. It is part of the Aughton and Downholland electoral ward for West Lancashire District Council elections and the West Lancashire constituency for the House of Commons elections.

Communications 
Aughton is bounded on the west by the A59 Liverpool to Preston road and bisected to the east by the B5197 Ormskirk to Kirkby road that runs north-south through the village.

The parish has two railway stations, Town Green and Aughton Park, both on the Northern Line of the Merseyrail network, and part of the former Liverpool, Ormskirk and Preston Railway.

Facilities 
Aughton has two shopping areas; on Moss Delph Lane and Town Green Lane. Also, there are playing fields and a park next to the fields and other open spaces totalling . There is a community centre, the Aughton Village Hall. The hall was opened in 1971 on land donated to the District Council. It is a registered charity and managed by a voluntary committee.

Having moved from premises in Holt Green, the official opening of the new Aughton police station on 3 March 2003 saw it occupy the old waiting room and general outbuildings of Town Green railway station. At that time, this police station was the first in the Lancashire Constabulary to have the enquiry counter staffed exclusively by volunteers.

There are two notable churches, Christ Church, a late Victorian building situated on Holborn Hill, one of the higher points in West Lancashire, and St Michael's Parish Church. St Michael's has been designated by English Heritage as a Grade I listed building. Aughton Park Baptist Church and St Mary's R C Church are also located within the civil parish. Moor Hall, on Prescot Road, is a Grade II* listed manor house built around 1600. It was converted in spring 2017 to a restaurant with rooms, being awarded a Michelin star later that year.

On Bold Lane is a social club, the Aughton Institute. Within the Institute is a memorial to three men from the Parish who were killed in World War I and to 40 men who served. It was unveiled on 11 February 1922 by the 17th Earl of Derby.

Notable connections 

 Donald Boumphrey, soldier and cricketer. Lived in Aughton, where he died in 1971
 Barry Cowan, tennis player, former member of Aughton Tennis Club
 Kieran Dowell, Everton footballer, was born in Aughton
 Roy Evans, former Liverpool FC player and manager, lives in Aughton
 Gavin Griffiths, Leicestershire County Cricketer, lives in Aughton
 John Grindrod 1919-2009, Anglican Primate of Australia, was born in Aughton on 14 December 1919
 Colin Harvey, footballer, lives in Aughton
 Alan Kennedy, former footballer, lived in Aughton.
Les Pattinson, bass player for Echo & the Bunnymen, was raised in Aughton
Will Sergeant, guitarist for Echo & the Bunnymen, lived in Aughton

Gallery

See also 

 Listed buildings in Aughton, Lancashire
 Argleton, a non-existent town which appeared on Google Maps within the boundaries of Aughton civil parish

References

External links

 Parish Council
 Aughton Village Hall
 Aughton Institute

 
Villages in Lancashire
Geography of the Borough of West Lancashire
Civil parishes in Lancashire